Blennorrhea is mucous discharge, especially from the urethra or vagina (that is, mucus vaginal discharge). Blennorrhagia is an excess of such discharge, often specifically referring to that seen in gonorrhea. In fact, blennorrhagia is also a German name of gonorrhea that was previously in use, but now no longer in technical use. Still, blennorrhagia is a major symptom of gonorrhea.

References

Symptoms and signs: Skin and subcutaneous tissue
Gonorrhea